FC MHM 93 Chișinău was a Moldovan football club based in Chişinău, Moldova. Between 1994 and 1997 they have played in the Moldovan National Division, the top division in Moldovan football.

Achievements

Divizia A
 Winners (1): 1993–94

External links
 FC MHM 93 Chișinău at WeltFussballArchiv 

Football clubs in Moldova
Football clubs in Chișinău
Defunct football clubs in Moldova
Association football clubs established in 1993
Association football clubs disestablished in 1997
1993 establishments in Moldova
1997 disestablishments in Moldova